"Boss" is a song by American rapper Lil Pump, released as the lead single from his self-titled debut album Lil Pump. It was originally released on Lil Pump's SoundCloud account on April 19, 2017, and later released as a single on June 6, 2017. The song reached number 40 on the US Hot R&B/Hip-Hop Songs chart, and was certified Platinum by the RIAA.

Charts

Certifications

References

2017 songs
2017 singles
Lil Pump songs
Warner Records singles
Songs written by Lil Pump